Lissia lissa, the Lissa recluse, is a species of butterfly in the family Hesperiidae. It is found in Cameroon, the Central African Republic, Uganda, Kenya and possibly Nigeria.

The larvae feed on Dracaena species.

Subspecies
Lissia lissa lissa - Cameroon, Central African Republic, and possibly Nigeria
Lissia lissa lima Evans, 1937 - Uganda, western Kenya

References

Butterflies described in 1937
Hesperiinae